Neopasites is a genus of cuckoo bees in the family Apidae. There are about 5 described species in Neopasites.

Species
 N. cressoni Crawford, 1916
 N. fulviventris (Cresson, 1878)
 N. mojavensis (Linsley, 1943)
 N. sierrae (Linsley, 1943)
 N. timberlakei (Linsley, 1943)

References

 Michener, Charles D. (2000). The Bees of the World, xiv + 913.
 Michener, Charles D. (2007). The Bees of the World, Second Edition, xvi + 953.

Further reading

 

Nomadinae